The Mowag Puma is one of the armored personnel carriers produced by Mowag based in Switzerland.

Design 
Emphasized in the Puma vehicles were buoyancy, high payload, high maneuverability and ease of operation in nuclear/biological/chemical (NBC) contaminated areas.

The 6x6 Puma has steerable wheels on the first and the third axles, while the wheels of the middle axle are fixed, which enables a tight turning circle.

Behind the two rear wheels is a ship propeller. The motor is housed in the front.

Grenadiers leave the vehicle through a door behind the turret hatch in the roof or through a large double door at the rear of the vehicle.

History 
The Puma was the first of a family of vehicles including the 4x4, 6x6 and 8x8, which were designed and built in the 4x4 and 6x6 versions with different weight divisions.

The Puma yielded important results for the 8x8 armored personnel carriers weapon carrier Mowag Shark.

A prototype of the Puma, which took part in various trials in Switzerland and at presentations at the Gurnigel, Bruggrugg and Oerlikon-Bührle premises Ochsenboden, is now in the Schweizerisches Militärmuseum Full. The Puma never went into series production.

References

Off-road vehicles
Armoured fighting vehicles of the Cold War
Armoured personnel carriers
Military vehicles of Switzerland
Abandoned military projects of Switzerland
Six-wheeled vehicles
Armoured personnel carriers of the Cold War
Wheeled amphibious armoured fighting vehicles
Wheeled armoured personnel carriers